Saint Lucia first participated at the Olympic Games in 1996, and has sent athletes to compete in every Summer Olympic Games since then.  The nation has never participated in the Winter Olympic Games.

To date, no athlete from Saint Lucia has ever won an Olympic medal.

The National Olympic Committee for Saint Lucia was created in 1987 and recognized by the International Olympic Committee in 1993.

Medal tables

Medals by Summer Games

See also
 List of flag bearers for Saint Lucia at the Olympics
 :Category:Olympic competitors for Saint Lucia

External links
 
 
 

 
Olympics